Senator Eaton may refer to:

Members of the United States Senate
John Eaton (politician) (1790–1856), U.S. Senator from Tennessee
William W. Eaton (1816–1898), U.S. Senator from Connecticut

United States state senate members
Barney Augustus Eaton (1853–1936), Wisconsin State Senate
Chris Eaton (politician) (born 1954), Minnesota State Senate
Ernest T. Eaton (1877–1957), Montana State Senate
Henry L. Eaton (1834–1890), Wisconsin State Senate
Horace Eaton (1804–1855), Vermont State Senate
Joe Oscar Eaton (1920–2008), Florida State Senate
Lewis Eaton (1790–1857), New York State Senate
Thomas R. Eaton (born c. 1949), New Hampshire State Senate